Pisz (pronounced  , previously also Jańsbork) is a historic town in the Warmian-Masurian Voivodeship in northern Poland, with a population of 19,466 (2016). It is the seat of Pisz County. Pisz is situated at the junction of Lake Roś and the Pisa River, in the region of Masuria.

Etymology 
The name Pisz originates from the word pisa, meaning 'swamp'  in the ancient Prussian language. Johannisburg received the name of the castle in 1645, when it became a city by the decree of Frederick William, Elector of Brandenburg. The local people of Masuria called the castle Jańsbork, and this name remained until 1946.

History

The site of today's Pisz was originally inhabited by the indigenous ethnic group of Old Prussians. In 1345 the Teutonic Order began constructing a castle nearby at the southernmost point of the Johannisburger Heide, or Piska Forest, in the Masurian Lake District. The castle was named Johannisburg, after St. John the Baptist. The settlement nearby held a market as early as 1367, but it was not until 1645 that it received its town charter. The town's first mayor was Fryderyk Adam Czerniewski. The official German name of the town was Johannisburg, while the Polish-speaking residents referred to it as Jańsbork. Its early growth owed much to the residents' skill in beekeeping, and it was located on trade routes leading to Gdańsk and to the Vistula and Narew Rivers.

The town became part of Ducal Prussia in 1525 and remained under Polish suzerainty until 1657. In 1639 Polish King Władysław IV Vasa visited the town. Later on, the town was part of Brandenburg-Prussia, and, after that it became part of the Kingdom of Prussia in 1701 and Germany in 1871. In 1698, King of Poland Augustus II the Strong and Elector of Brandenburg Frederick I held a meeting in the local castle. Polish King Stanisław Leszczyński stopped in the town in 1709 and 1734 and in 1813 Tsar Alexander I of Russia stayed here.

In 1709/10 only 14 inhabitants survived the plague. The town began to develop extensively in the 19th century. In 1818 it became the seat of the Landkreis Johannisburg in the province East Prussia. The town's population in 1876 was approximately 3,000. A railway built connecting Allenstein (Olsztyn) and Lyck (Ełk) ran through Johannisburg. Its water supply system and gas works were built in 1907 and its municipal slaughterhouse in 1913. The town's industrial development focused on wood processing and metallurgy. According to the 1900 Imperial German census, Johannisburg's population consisted of 70.2% Masurians.

As a result of the treaty of Versailles, the 1920 East Prussian plebiscite was organized under the control of the League of Nations, which resulted in 2,940 votes to remain in East Prussia, and therefore Germany, and none for Poland.

During World War II, Johannisburg was 70% destroyed by fighting and occupation by the Soviet Red Army. At war's end in 1945, it was transferred from German to Polish control according to the Potsdam Agreement and officially renamed Pisz in 1946. The name Pisz comes from the Old Prussian word pisa ("swamp"), owing to the muddy water from nearby Lake Roś. The remaining German-speaking part of the town's populace was expelled and replaced with Poles.

Little of pre-war Johannisburg survived the warfare aside from its Gothic town hall, but much of Pisz has been restored in recent decades. The town is a popular place to begin sailing on the Masurian lakes. Historical sites include the ruins of the Teutonic Knights' Johannisburg castle and the Church of St. John.

Economy 
Due to natural resources comprising the reach forestry and shallow deposits of bog iron ore, the industrial traditions of Pisz are connected with wood processing (the sawmill) and metallurgy. There are iron works in Wądołek, as well as the industrial smithies in Wiartl and in Jaśkowo. The wood processing industry has a long tradition in Pisz. The core of the industry is its sawmill, supporting a broadbase plywood industry with a plant called Zakłady Przemysłu Sklejek.

Pisz is a centre of tourism industry, with boat trips, canoeing and kayaking along the Krutynia River, as well as with popular yachting voyages on the Masurian Lakes known in Polish as Kraina Wielkich Jezior. On the shore of Nidzkie Lake there's the K. I. Gałczyński Museum in Leśniczówka Pranie. There is a museum in the 9th century granary displaying historical artifacts and a notable collection of antlers. There are horse and horse-drawn carriage trips. The town is surrounded by the largest forest complex of the Masuria region, known as Puszcza Piska (Piska Primeval Forest) with eleven nature reserves.

Notable residents 
 Georg Christoph Pisanski (born 1725), historian of Prussia
 Ludwig Yorck von Wartenburg (1759–1830) town commander
 Gustaw Gizewiusz (1810–1848), activist
 Samuel Lublinski (1868–1910) writer, literary historian, critic and philosopher of religion
 Günther Strupp (1912–1996), artist 
 Marianne Hold (1929–1994), actress
 Zbigniew Włodkowski (born 1961), politician
 Marcin Kaczmarek (born 1977), Olympic butterfly swimmer

References 

Castles of the Teutonic Knights
Cities and towns in Warmian-Masurian Voivodeship
Pisz County